This may refer to:
 Ministry of Foreign Affairs (North Korea)
 Ministry of Foreign Affairs (South Korea)